is a subway station on the Sendai Subway Tōzai Line in Wakabayashi-ku, Sendai, Japan, operated by the municipal subway operator Sendai City Transportation Bureau.

Lines
Arai Station is served by the  Sendai Subway Tōzai Line, and forms the eastern terminus of the line. The station is numbered "T13".

Station layout
The station has one island platform serving two tracks on the basement ("B1F") level. The ticket barriers are located on the ground floor ("1F") level.

Platforms

Gallery

History
The station opened on 6 December 2015, coinciding with the opening of the Tōzai Line.

Passenger statistics
In fiscal 2015, the station was used by an average of 2,254 passengers daily.

Surrounding area
 Arai Depot
 Sendai Shichigo Junior High School
 Sendai Shichigo Elementary School
 Sendai GIGS
 Wakabayashi Police station

See also
 List of railway stations in Japan

References

External links

  

Sendai Subway Tozai Line
Railway stations in Sendai
Railway stations in Japan opened in 2015